Racing Club Caumont XIII  are a French Rugby league club based in Caumont-sur-Durance, Vaucluse in the Provence-Alpes-Côte d'Azur region. The club plays in the Provence-Alpes-Côte d'Azur (PACA) League of the French National Division 2.

History 

Racing Club Caumont XIII won the Federal Division now called the National Division 2 4th tier competition in 2003-2004 when they beat Villeneuve Tolosane in the final 26-24 to record their first and to date only honour.

Club honours 

 National Division 2 (Fédéral Division) (1): 2003-04

Club Details 

President:
Address: Racing Club Caumont XIII, Bar La Veranda, Place De La Mairie, 84150 Caumont Sur Durance
Tel: 04 90 23 07 05
Email:

See also 

National Division 2

1919 establishments in France
French rugby league teams
Rugby clubs established in 1919